The Drugs and Magic Remedies (Objectionable Advertisements) Act, 1954 is an Act of the Parliament of India which controls advertising of drugs in India. It prohibits advertisements of drugs and remedies that claim to have magical properties, and makes doing so a cognizable offence.

Overview
The act defines "magic remedy" as any talisman, mantra, amulet or any other object which is claimed to have miraculous powers to cure, diagnose, prevent or mitigate a disease in humans or animal. It also includes such devices that are claimed to have power to influence structure or function of an organ in humans or animals.

The law prohibits advertising of drugs and remedies for

inducing miscarriage or preventing conception in women
improving or maintaining the capacity for sexual pleasure
correction of menstrual disorders
curing, diagnosing or preventing any disease or condition mentioned in an included schedule

The original included schedule contained a list of 54 diseases and conditions:

The act stated that the schedule may be changed later to include more diseases for which there are no accepted remedies or for which timely consultation with a registered medical practitioner (as defined under Indian Medical Degrees Act, 1916 or Indian Medical Councils Act, 1956; includes other state laws too) is required. The act stated that these changes must made it consultation with the Drugs Technical Advisory Board, and Ayurveda and Unani practitioners, if deemed as necessary by the Central government.

The penalty carries a maximum sentence of 6 months imprisonment with or without fine on first conviction. In case of any subsequent conviction, the term may be up to a year. If the convicted party is a company, all members of the company will be deemed guilty.

Criticism and future amendments
The law is rarely enforced and several such products are freely available to the public. The law is considered severely outdated as 14 of the diseases in the list are now curable, and newer diseases like AIDS are not on the list. Some advertisements of these categories are also known to appear on cable television channels without much repercussions. Proposed amendments to this law has also raised questions regarding the status of traditional medicine systems like Yoga and Ayurveda with respect to modern medicine.

See also
 Superstition in India
 Drugs and Cosmetics Act, 1940
 Schedule J of the Drugs and Cosmetics Rules, 1945

References

Acts of the Parliament of India 1954
Pharmaceutical industry of India
Advertising in India
Advertising regulation
Drug control law in India
Regulation in India